Cash is a surname. Notable people with the surname include:

 Alan-Michael Cash (born 1987), American football player
 Andrew Cash (born 1962), Canadian singer-songwriter
 Aya Cash (born 1982), American television, film and stage actress
 Bill Cash (born 1940), British Member of Parliament
 Chris Cash (American football) (born 1980), player for the Atlanta Falcons
 Craig Cash (born 1960), English comedy writer and performer
 Dave Cash (baseball) (born 1948), former Major League baseball player
 Dave Cash (DJ) (1942–2016), British radio presenter
 Dave Cash (Yiddish comedian), Romanian-born Yiddish comedian
 David Cash (born 1969), birth name of American wrestler performing as "Kid Kash"
 Doug Cash (1919–2002), Australian politician
 Dylan Cash (born 1994), American child actor
 Felix Cash (born 1993), British boxer
 Fred Cash (born 1940), African-American soul singer
 Gerald Cash (1917–2003), third Governor-General of the Commonwealth of the Bahamas
 George Cash (born 1946), Australian politician
 James Bailey Cash Jr. (1932–1938), American murder victim
 James Cash Jr. (born 1947), American businessman
 Jessica Cash, British soprano and voice coach
 Jim Cash (1941–2000), American film writer
 Johnny Cash (1932–2003), American singer-songwriter
 June Carter Cash (1929–2003), Johnny's wife
 John Carter Cash (born 1970), Johnny's son
 Rosanne Cash (born 1955), Johnny's daughter
 Tommy Cash (born 1940), Johnny's brother
 Carey Cash, Johnny's grand-nephew
 Kellye Cash, Johnny's grand-niece
 Kevin Cash (born 1977), American Major League baseball catcher
 Martin Cash (1808–1877), famous escaped convict in Australia
 Matty Cash (born 1997), Polish footballer 
 Michaelia Cash (born 1970), Australian politician
 Norm Cash (1934–1986), American Major League baseball player
 Pat Cash (born 1965), Australian professional tennis player
 Peter Cash, Canadian singer-songwriter
 Porkchop Cash (born 1955), stage name of American professional wrestler Bobby Cash
 Ralston Cash (born 1991), American baseball player
 Ray Cash (born 1980), American rapper
 Ron Cash (1949–2009), American Major League Baseball player
 Rosalind Cash (1938–1995), American singer and actress
 Steve Cash (born 1946), American singer-songwriter
 Swin Cash (born 1979), American Woman's National Basketball Association player
 Tabatha Cash (born 1973), French pornographic actress
 Wilbur J. Cash (politician) (1887–1956), American politician, farmer, and politician
 Wiley Cash, American author
 W. J. Cash (1900–1941), American author and journalist
 William Cash (author and journalist), British journalist
 William H. H. Cash (1843-1924), American businessman and politician